The 1986 North Indian Ocean cyclone season was part of the annual cycle of tropical cyclone formation. The season has no official bounds but cyclones tend to form between April and December. These dates conventionally delimit the period of each year when most tropical cyclones form in the northern Indian Ocean. There are two main seas in the North Indian Ocean—the Bay of Bengal to the east of the Indian subcontinent and the Arabian Sea to the west of India. The official Regional Specialized Meteorological Centre in this basin is the India Meteorological Department (IMD), while the Joint Typhoon Warning Center (JTWC) releases unofficial advisories. An average of five tropical cyclones form in the North Indian Ocean every season with peaks in May and November. Cyclones occurring between the meridians 45°E and 100°E are included in the season by the IMD.

The season was quiet, with only 3 systems.

Systems

Tropical Storm One (1B)

Tropical Depression 1B developed southeast of Sri Lanka on January 7. It tracked northwestward, briefly strengthening to a 50 mph tropical storm before upper-level winds caused it to dissipate on the 11th.

Tropical Storm Two (2B)

A tropical disturbance slowly organized into a tropical depression on November 6 in the Bay of Bengal. It turned to the northeast, became a tropical storm, and reached a peak of 60 mph winds before hitting Bangladesh on the 9th. The storm dissipated on the 10th, after causing 11 casualties and heavy damage.

Tropical Storm Three (3A)

From November 9 to the 11th, Tropical Storm Three existed over the open Arabian Sea, dissipating due to vertical shear.

See also

North Indian Ocean tropical cyclone
1986 Atlantic hurricane season
1986 Pacific hurricane season
1986 Pacific typhoon season
Australian cyclone seasons: 1985–86, 1986–87
South Pacific cyclone seasons: 1985–86, 1986–87
South-West Indian Ocean cyclone seasons: 1985–86, 1986–87

References

External links
India Meteorological Department
Joint Typhoon Warning Center